Bo Omoniyi Adebayo (born March 25, 1988 in Edmonton, Alberta) is a Canadian football defensive lineman formerly of the Edmonton Eskimos of the Canadian Football League. He played college football for the Western Kentucky Hilltoppers.

Professional career

Montreal Alouettes
Adebayo was selected 18th overall by the Montreal Alouettes in the 2012 CFL Draft and was signed by the team on May 24, 2012.

Edmonton Eskimos
Adebayo was signed off the Montreal Alouettes' practice roster by the Edmonton Eskimos on September 30, 2014.

References

External links
Edmonton Eskimos bio 

1988 births
Living people
Edmonton Elks players
Players of Canadian football from Alberta
Canadian football people from Edmonton
Western Kentucky University alumni
Western Kentucky Hilltoppers football players
Canadian football defensive linemen
Montreal Alouettes players